The sixth cabinet of Ion I. C. Brătianu was the government of Romania from 19 January 1922 to 29 March 1926.

Ministers
The ministers of the cabinet were as follows:

President of the Council of Ministers:
Ion I. C. Brătianu (19 January 1922 - 29 March 1926)
Minister of State:
Ion Inculeț (19 January 1922 - 29 March 1926)
Minister of State:
Ion Nistor (19 January 1922 - 29 March 1926)
Minister of the Interior: 
Gen. Artur Văitoianu (19 January 1922 - 30 October 1923)
Ion I. C. Brătianu (30 October 1923 - 29 March 1926)
Minister of Foreign Affairs: 
Ion Gh. Duca (19 January 1922 - 29 March 1926)
Minister of Finance:
Vintilă I.C. Brătianu (19 January 1922 - 29 March 1926)
Minister of Justice:
Ioan Th. Florescu (19 January 1922 - 30 October 1923)
George G. Mârzescu (30 October 1923 - 29 March 1926)
Minister of War:
Ion I. C. Brătianu (19 January - 25 March 1922)
Gen. Gheorghe Mărdărescu (25 March 1922 - 29 March 1926)
Minister of Public Works:
(interim) Constantin Banu (19 - 24 January 1922)
Aurel Cosma (24 January 1922 - 30 October 1923)
Gen. Traian Moșoiu (30 October 1923 - 29 March 1926)
Minister of Communications:
(interim) Constantin Angelescu (19 - 24 January 1922)
Gen. Traian Moșoiu (24 January 1922 - 30 October 1923)
Gen. Artur Văitoianu (30 October 1923 - 29 March 1926)
Minister of Industry and Commerce:
Vasile P. Sassu (19 January 1922 - 30 October 1923)
Tancred Constantinescu (30 October 1923 - 29 March 1926)
Minister of Public Instruction:
Constantin Angelescu (19 January 1922 - 29 March 1926)
Minister of Religious Affairs and the Arts:
Constantin Banu (19 January 1922 - 30 October 1923)
Alexandru Lapedatu (30 October 1923 - 29 March 1926)
Minister of Agriculture and interim Minister of Property:
Alexandru Constantinescu (19 January - 10 April 1922)
Minister of Agriculture and Property:
Alexandru Constantinescu (10 April 1922 - 29 March 1926)
Minister of Labour and Social Security:
George G. Mârzescu (19 January - 26 April 1922)
Minister of Public Health, Labour and Social Welfare:
George G. Mârzescu (26 April 1922 - 30 October 1923)
Nicolae N. Săveanu (30 October - 3 November 1923)
Minister of Public Health and Social Welfare:
Nicolae N. Săveanu (3 November 1923 - 29 March 1926)
Ministry of Labour, Social Insurance and Cooperation:
Nicolae Chirculescu (3 November 1923 - 29 March 1926)

References

Cabinets of Romania
Cabinets established in 1922
Cabinets disestablished in 1926
1922 establishments in Romania
1926 disestablishments in Romania